The Dapeng dialect is a Chinese dialect, a variant of Cantonese with a strong Hakka influence that was originally only spoken on the Dapeng Peninsula of Shenzhen, Guangdong, China. The Chinese diaspora has spread the dialect to places with large populations whose ancestral roots are originally from Dapeng, Shenzhen, Guangdong. Today, their descendants live in Hong Kong; the Randstad region of the Netherlands; Portsmouth, United Kingdom; and New York City, United States.

The dialect is a form of junhua, created as a lingua franca by soldiers at the Dapeng Fortress, who spoke various forms of Cantonese and Hakka. Despite strong influence from Hakka, some, including Lau Chun-Fat, have classified it as a Guan–Bao dialect.

References

Hakka Chinese
Yue Chinese
Shenzhen
Dapeng New District
Military life
Languages attested from the 2nd millennium